Bhilwara MEMU coach factory is a factory under construction in Bhilwara, Rajasthan, India. It will be situated near the Rupaheli railway station. Once completed, it will produce mainline electrical multiple unit coaches for Indian Railways. The factory will be the second to produce MEMU coaches in India; the other is in Kapurthala, Punjab. The factory was introduced on 25.02.2013, and project is pending till date in pink book of railways.

References

Bhilwara district
Coach and wagon manufacturers of India
Economy of Rajasthan